The 1968 LFF Lyga was the 47th season of the LFF Lyga football competition in Lithuania.  It was contested by 16 teams, and Statyba Panevezys won the championship.

League standings

References
RSSSF

LFF Lyga seasons
1968 in Lithuania
LFF